The Calpinae are a subfamily of moths in the family Erebidae described by Jean Baptiste Boisduval in 1840.  This subfamily includes many species of moths that have a pointed and barbed proboscis adapted to piercing the skins of fruit to feed on juice, and in the case of the several Calyptra species of vampire moths, to piercing the skins of mammals to feed on blood. The subfamily contains some large moths with wingspans longer than 5 cm (2 in).

Taxonomy
Recent phylogenetic studies have greatly revised this subfamily.  The subfamily was previously classified within the Noctuidae, but the redefinition of that family has reclassified many of that family's subfamilies, including Calpinae, into the family Erebidae. The Calpinae are most closely related to a clade including the subfamilies Eulepidotinae and Hypocalinae, which are also among the Erebidae. The tribes Anomini and Scoliopterygini, previously included in the Calpinae, were found to be distantly related and were reclassified into a separate subfamily as the Scoliopteryginae.

Tribes
The Calpinae consist of three monophyletic tribes.
Calpini
Ophiderini
Phyllodini

Previous taxonomy

The status of the former composition of the Calpinae was somewhat disputed; it was sometimes merged into the Catocalinae. Most of the calpine genera were not further classified. The phylogenetic structure of this group was essentially unresolved, and in many cases it was even doubtful whether the genera were indeed correctly placed in this subfamily.

Tribe Calpini
 Africalpe Krüger, 1939
 Calyptra Ochsenheimer, 1816
 Eudocima Billberg, 1820
 Ferenta Walker, 1858
 Gonodonta Hübner, 1818
 Graphigona Walker, 1858
 Oraesia Boisduval & Guenée, 1852
 Plusiodonta Boisduval & Guenée, 1852
 Tetrisia Walker, 1867

Tribe Gonopterini
 Scoliopteryx

Genera incertae sedis
 Cecharismena Möschler, 1890
 Culasta Moore, 1881
 Euryschema Turner, 1925
 Epicyrtica Turner, 1908
 Goniapteryx Perty, 1833
 Hemiceratoides Strand, 1911
 Pharga Walker, 1863
 Phyprosopus Grote, 1872
 Psammathodoxa Dyar, 1921
 Radara Walker, 1862

Genera provisionally placed here (incomplete list); includes taxa sometimes separated in Ophiderinae

References

External links 

Calpinae
Moth subfamilies